The 1926 Washington and Lee Generals football team represented Washington and Lee University during the 1926 college football season. Fullback Ty Rauber was All-Southern and third team AP All-America, the school's first player to make any All-America team.

Schedule

Coaching staff
 Head coach: James P. Herron
 Assistant coach: James Kay Thomas

References

Washington and Lee
Washington and Lee Generals football seasons
Washington and Lee Generals football